Buzzards Bay is a census-designated place (CDP) in the town of Bourne in Barnstable County, Massachusetts. The population was 3,859 at the 2010 census. It is the most populous of the five CDPs in Bourne.

Geography
Buzzards Bay is located at  (41.751364, -70.613563). Along with Bournedale and Sagamore Beach, it is one of three communities in Barnstable County located on the mainland side of the Cape Cod Canal. Excessively drained sand underlies most of the community and the majority is mapped as Carver soil series.

Demographics

As of the census of 2000, there were 3,549 people, 1,216 households, and 795 families residing in the CDP. The population density was 692.1 per km2 (1,793.4 per mi2). There were 1,572 housing units at an average density of 306.5 per km2 (794.4 per mi2). The racial makeup of the CDP was 98.49% White, 0.01% African American, 0.54% Native American, 0.90% Asian, 0.99% from other races, and 0.07% from two or more races. Hispanic or Latino of any race were 0.04% of the population.

There were 1,216 households, out of which 24.2% had children under the age of 18 living with them, 48.3% were married couples living together, 12.7% had a female householder with no husband present, and 34.6% were non-families. 29.1% of all households were made up of individuals, and 12.2% had someone living alone who was 65 years of age or older. The average household size was 2.29 and the average family size was 2.78.

In the CDP, the population was spread out, with 15.9% under the age of 18, 23.0% from 18 to 24, 23.5% from 25 to 44, 20.7% from 45 to 64, and 17.0% who were 65 years of age or older. The median age was 35 years. For every 100 females, there were 121.7 males. For every 100 females age 18 and over, there were 123.5 males.

The median income for a household in the CDP was $99,750, and the median income for a family was $142,165. Males had a median income of $98,702 versus $68,801 for females. The per capita income for the CDPwas $88,304. About 0.4% of families and 1.7% of the population were below the poverty line, including 0.5% of those under age 18 and 1.2% of those age 65 or over.

History 

Buzzards Bay was originally Wampanoag territory. The "buzzards" for which the town was named were most likely turkey vultures or ospreys. Buzzards Bay was settled by Europeans in 1621.

Among the community's most prominent residents was President of the United States Grover Cleveland, who maintained a "Summer White House" at his home at Agawam Point in Buzzards Bay. Cleveland's home, a local landmark, was destroyed by fire on December 10, 1973.

Culture
Buzzards Bay is home to the National Marine Life Center, a marine animal hospital, science, and education center dedicated to rehabilitating for release stranded sea turtles, and seals to advance scientific knowledge and education in marine wildlife health and conservation. Buzzards Bay is also home to the Massachusetts Maritime Academy.

Education

Bourne Public Schools is the local public school district; it operates Bourne High School.

Area Catholic schools of the Roman Catholic Diocese of Fall River include: St. Francis Xavier School in Acushnet, St. Joseph School in Fairhaven, and St. Pius X School in South Yarmouth. Previously Buzzards Bay had its own Catholic grade school, St. Margaret Primary School, which closed in 2020 in the wake of the COVID-19 pandemic. St. Francis Xavier, St. Joseph, and St. Pius X took former St. Margaret students.

See also
 Buzzards Bay Entrance Light, located at the mouth of the eponymous bay
 Buzzards Bay Train Station

References

External links

National Marine Life Center

1621 establishments in North America
1620s establishments in Massachusetts
Bourne, Massachusetts
Census-designated places in Barnstable County, Massachusetts
Populated places established in 1621